Shenyang Engineering Institute comes under the Liaoning Provincial People's Government, with an area of 920,000 square meters, and a construction area of 270,000 square meters.

References

External links
Official Chinese language website
A guide to Shenyang China website
Shenyang Institute of Engineering Online Judge -- the 3rd OJ system in Liaoning Province
Unofficial BBS of Shenyang Institute of Engineering

Universities and colleges in Liaoning